Gems, or gemstones, are polished, cut stones or minerals.

Gems or GEMS may also refer to:

Arts, entertainment and media
Gems (Aerosmith album), 1988
Gems (Patti LaBelle album), 1994
Gems (Michael Bolton album), 2011
Gems TV, a jewellery manufacturer and TV shopping network headquartered in Chanthaburi, Thailand
Gems TV (German TV channel)
Gems TV (UK)
Gems TV (USA)
Gems (TV series), a British soap opera, 1985–1988
Gems & Gemology, a quarterly scientific journal 
Sonic Gems Collection, a 2005 compilation of video games

Businesses and organisations
GEMS Education, an international education company
GEMS Girls' Clubs, a Christian organization
Gaston Emergency Medical Services, ambulance service in North Carolina, U.S.
Girls Educational and Mentoring Services, a non-profit organization

People
David Gems (born 1960), a British geneticist and biogerontologist
Jonathan Gems (born 1952), a British playwright and screenwriter

Science and technology
GEMS, software from Conning (company)
GEMs, or lipid rafts, glycolipid-enriched complexes in biology
Generic Eclipse Modeling System, software development tool
Geophysical Monitoring Station, former name of InSight, a Mars lander mission
Global Election Management System, software by Premier Election Solutions
Gravity and Extreme Magnetism SMEX, a NASA project 
GeMS, a system at the Gemini Observatory

Sport
Australia women's national under-19 basketball team, nicknamed the Gems

See also

Gem (disambiguation)
RubyGems, a package manager for the Ruby programming language